The 2015–16 season in Primera División de Nicaragua was divided into two tournaments (Apertura and Clausura) and determined the 67th and 68th champions in the history of the league. It also provided the sole berth for the 2016–17 CONCACAF Champions League. The Apertura tournament was played in the second half of 2015, while the Clausura was played in the first half of 2016.

Teams

A total of 10 teams will contest the league, including 8 sides from the 2015–16 season and one sids directly promoted from the 2014–145Segunda division. The final participant will be determined in a two-legged play-off, in which the 9th placed Primera division side UNAN Managua will play the team who finished second in Segunda division which was FC San Marcos. UNAN Managua won 6-0 on aggregate over FC San Marcos which meant they stayed in the Primera Division.

 ART Jalapa
 Diriangén FC
 UCEM Juventus FC
 Managua F.C.
 Deportivo Ocotal
 Real Madriz
 Real Esteli F.C.
  UNAN Managua
 Chinandega FC (Winner of the Segunda Division)
 Walter Ferretti

Promotion and relegation
 At the end of the 2014–15, Chinandega FC  was promoted to Primera Division
 At the end of the 2014–15, Fox Villa was relegated to Segunda Division.

Apertura

Team information
Last updated: 2015

Personnel and sponsoring (2015 Apertura)

Managerial changes

Before the season

During the season

Regular season
The regular season began on 2015. The top four finishers will move on to the next stage of the competition.

Scoring 
First goal of the season:  Rodrigo Hernandez own goal for Managua F.C. against UNAN Managua , 10 minutes (15 August 2015)
First goal by a foreign player:  Jonathan Donado for UNAN Managua against Managua F.C., 20 minutes (15 August 2015)
Fastest goal in a match: 10 minute -  TBD for TBD against TBD (TBD TBD 2015)
Goal scored at the latest point in a match: 94 minutes -  Christian Cisneros for Metapan against C.D. Chalatenango (1 August 2015) 
First penalty Kick of the season:  Marlon Lopez for Managua F.C. against UNAN Managua, 75 minutes (15 August 2015)
Widest winning margin: 8 goals
UNAN Managua 9–1 ART Municipal Jalapa (18 November 2015)
First hat-trick of the season: Darwin Ramirez for Juventus Managua against Real Madriz (August 24, 2015)
First own goal of the season: Rodriguez Hernandez (UNAN Managua) for Managua F.C. (August 152015)
Most goals in a match: 10 Goals UNAN Managua 9–1 ART Municipal Jalapa (18 November 2015)  Juventus Managua 5–5 Managua F.C. (15 August 2015)
Most goals by one team in a match: 9 Goals
UNAN Managua 9–1 ART Municipal Jalapa (18 November 2015)
Most goals in one half by one team: 5 Goals UNAN Managua 9–1 ART Municipal Jalapa (18 November 2015)
Most goals scored by losing team: 2 Goals
ART Jalapa 2–5 Real Madriz (September, 2015)
Most goals by one player in a single match: 5 Goals
 Daniel Reyes for UNAN Managua against ART Municipal Jalapa (18 November 2015)

Standings

Results

Positions by round

Playoffs

Semi-finals

First leg

Second leg

Diriangen won 1-0 on aggregate.

UNAN Managua won 4-3 on aggregate.

Finals

First leg

Second leg

 UNAN Managua won 3-1 on aggregate score.

List of foreign players in the league
This is a list of foreign players in Apertura 2015. The following players:
have played at least one apertura game for the respective club.
have not been capped for the Nicaragua national football team on any level, independently from the birthplace

A new rule was introduced this year, that clubs can only have five foreign players in a squad.

Jalapa
  Camilo Quiñones
  Erling Ruiz 
  Arlis Lizandro Andino
  Andres Garzon
  Jose Luis Rodriguez

Chinandega
   Bryan Cañate
   Erwin Cabrera
  Renán Laín
  Cristian Izaguirre
  Jaime Romo
   Erick Alcázar

Diriangén
  Lucas Martella
  Lucas Carrera
  Andres Giraldo
  Carlos Leonel Torres
  Sergio Arzamendia

Juventus Managua
  Anderson Palacio
  Roland Quintero
  Ronny Colón
  Cesar Salandía
  Rudy Williams

Managua
  Darwing Güity
  Ronny Bello

 (player released mid season)

Ocotal
  Jesus Guerrero
  Emiro Manuel Gomez
  Michael Williams
  Jorge Rivas
  Marcos Alfredo Rivera
  Jason Diaz

Real Esteli
  Vinicius De Sousa
  Devis Gutiérrez
  Marcel Cecel
  Leandro Cruz de Oliveira
  Jonathan Mosquera
  Álvaro Brum

Real Madriz
  Miguel Estrada
  Luis Valladares
  Armando Valdez
  German Arias Ramírez
  Jefreg Javier Olivero

UNAN Managua
  Jonathon Donado
  Rodrigo Rodriguez
  Evaristo González
  Oscar Palomino
  Juan Vidal Congo 
  Luis Fernándo Gonzáles

Walter Ferretti
  Eder Munive
  Rodrigo Valiente
  Marlon Barrios
  Bernardo Laureiro
  Maycon Santana
  Gonzalo Ancheta

Clausura

Team information
Last updated: 2015

Personnel and sponsoring (2016 Clausura)

Managerial changes

Before the season

During the season

Regular season
The regular season began on 2015. The top four finishers will move on to the next stage of the competition.

Scoring 
First goal by a foreign player:  Leandro Cruz de Oliveira for Real Esteli against Deportivo Ocotal, 69 minutes (17 January 2016)
Fastest goal in a match: 3 minute -  Baez for Real Madriz against Diriangen FC (January 16, 2016)
Goal scored at the latest point in a match: 87 minutes -  Daniel Reyes for UNAN Managua against Managua F.C. (16 January 2016)
First penalty Kick of the season:  Marlon Lopez for Managua F.C. against UNAN Managua, 75 minutes (15 August 2015)
Widest winning margin: 5 goals
Real Esteli 5–0 Deportivo Ocotal (17 November 2016)
First hat-trick of the season: TBD for TBD against TBD (2016)
First own goal of the season: Rodriguez Hernandez (UNAN Managua) for Managua F.C. (2016)
Most goals in a match: 5 Goals Real Esteli 5–0 Deportivo Ocotal (17 November 2016)
Most goals by one team in a match: 5 Goals
Real Esteli 5–0 Deportivo Ocotal (17 November 2016)
Most goals in one half by one team: 3 Goals Real Esteli 5–0 Deportivo Ocotal (17 November 2016) and ART Municipal Jalapa against Chinandega FC (18 November 2015)
Most goals scored by losing team: 2 Goals
Real Madriz 2–5 Real Esteli (28 February 2016)
Most goals by one player in a single match: 3 Goals
 Carlos Chavarria for Real Esteli against Real Madriz (28 February 2016)

Standings

Results

Positions by round

Playoffs

Semi-finals

First leg

Second leg

Real Estelí won 8-2 on aggregate.

Walter Ferretti won 2-1 on aggregate.

Finals

First leg

Second leg

Real Estelí won 1-0 on aggregate.

List of foreign players in the league
This is a list of foreign players in Clausura 2016. The following players:
have played at least one apertura game for the respective club.
have not been capped for the Nicaragua national football team on any level, independently from the birthplace

A new rule was introduced this year, that clubs can only have five foreign players in a squad.

Jalapa
  Erling Ruiz 
  Arlis Lizandro Andino
  Mario Borja
  Leonel Escoto 
  Javier Espinales

Chinandega
   Bryan Cañate
  Renán Lalín
   José Julio Carballo
   Erick Alcázar
   Richard Junior Charris
   Luis Miguel Paterson

Diriangén
  Lucas Martella
  Felipe Cristiano Ferreira 
  Rafael Vieira
  Andres Giraldo
  Daniel Olcina

Juventus Managua
  Andrés Arce Versi 
  Cesar Salandía
  Juan José Tablada

Managua
  Darwing Güity
  Ronny Bello
  Juan Muriel
  Hermes Palomino

 (player released mid season)

Ocotal
  Nelsón Maldonado  
  Esteban Tapia
  Luis Martínez
  Dixon Mauricio 
  Marcos Alfredo Rivera
  Jose Sebastian Bedoya

Real Esteli
  Leandro Da Cruz
  Jonathan Mosquera
  David Lazari
  Leonardo Fernandes
  Ricardo Silva de Almeida
  Christiano Da Lima

Real Madriz
  Carlos Alfredo Gonzalez
  Richart Misael Cerna
  Luis Valladares
  Armando Valdèz Caicedo

UNAN Managua
  Jonathan Donado
  Rodrigo Hernandez
  Evaristo González
  Oscar Palomino
  Luis Fernándo González
  John Hernández

Walter Ferretti
  Rodrigo Valiente
  Bernardo Laureiro
  Jorge Valentín Bodden
  Mario Girón 
  Allan Gutierrez

Championship playoff

First leg

Second leg

 Real Estelí won 3–1 on aggregate score.

Aggregate table

References

External links
 https://int.soccerway.com/national/nicaragua/1a-division/2015-2016/apertura/

Nicaraguan Primera División seasons
1
Nicaragua